Egmond Abbey or St. Adalbert's Abbey (Sint-Adelbertabdij) is a Benedictine monastery of the Congregation of the Annunciation between Egmond aan den Hoef and Bakkum in Egmond-Binnen in the municipality of Bergen in the Dutch province of North Holland. Founded in 920-925 and destroyed in the Reformation, it was re-founded in 1935 as the present Sint-Adelbertabdij, in the Diocese of Haarlem.

History

Egmond was the oldest monastery of the Holland region. According to tradition, the Benedictine abbey was founded by Dirk I, Count of Holland, in about 920-925.  It was a nunnery erected near a small wooden church built over the grave of Saint Adalbert. In about 950 work began on a stone church to replace the wooden one, as a gift from Dirk II, Count of Holland, and his wife Hildegard, to house the relics of Saint Adalbert. The consecration of the new church apparently took place in or shortly after 975, and is recorded in the Egmond Gospels, presented to the abbey by Dirk. At the same time a community of Benedictine monks from Saint Peter's Abbey, Ghent replaced the nuns, who under their abbess Erlinde, daughter of Count Dirk, were transferred to a newly established nunnery, Bennebroek Abbey.
 

The abbey had many property and feudal rights. Its library and scriptorium were very important. Monks served as scribes in the ducal chancery. Dirk I, the founder, was buried there, as were many subsequent counts of Holland and members of their families, including Dirk II, Arnulf, Dirk III, Floris I, Dirk V, and Floris II. Egbert, the son of Dirk II, was educated at Egmond and later became Archbishop of Trier.

The Count Lamoral, owner of the nearby castle, was beheaded in 1568, and this started the Dutch Revolt. Shortly afterwards, in 1573, the abbey was dissolved and laid waste just before the siege of Alkmaar on the orders of Diederik Sonoy to prevent it being used by the Spanish. The abbey's income was diverted by the stadtholder to the financing of his educational project, the newly formed Leiden University.

Relationship to Egmond Castle

North of the abbey is the site of Egmond Castle in Egmond aan den Hoef. The castle was built by the knight Berwout van Egmond in 1129, who was paid by the Count of Holland to represent him, protect the abbey and collect the rents, as Voogd. This was the origin of the House of Egmond. The relationship quickly turned into a power struggle between the Egmond family and the abbots that lasted for centuries. Just like the abbey, the castle was destroyed in 1573. The chapel was later restored by the Dutch Protestant church, but the castle was never rebuilt. The foundations are still visible and the land surrounding the old moat and foundations has been turned into a park.

Sint-Adelbertabdij
In 1933 a new Benedictine community, the Sint-Adelbertabdij, was founded on the site of the former Egmond Abbey, and was again dedicated to Saint Adalbert. Buildings were refurbished and extended in the late 1940s and early 1950s; the monastery was elevated to an abbey in 1950. The farmlands were put back to use, though since 1989 however the agricultural lands have been let to a farmer. A candle-making operation was started in 1945 to support the community, and later a pottery workplace was added.

In 1984 the relics of Saint Adalbert were returned here, having been kept safe in Haarlem since the destruction of the previous monastery in the 16th century, and are enshrined beneath the altar.

In the spring of 2003 the monks had solar panels installed which were promptly stolen two weeks later, a loss of €20,000. An online collection was held to help pay for new panels.

In December 2021, the Abbey donated a relic of Saint Nicholas to the Basilica of Saint Nicholas in Amsterdam. Said to be a fragment of the saint's rib, the bone has been in the custody of the Abbey since 1087.

Legacy
Many artefacts from the old abbey have been recovered in the years since the 'beeldenstorm' of 1568, such as the altarpiece of 1530, and the Egmond Tympanum, a 12th-century tympanum originally set over the portal of the west front of the abbey church, which since 1842 has been preserved in the Rijksmuseum. At first it was assumed that all the abbey's possessions had been burned, but in fact they had been sold by the Protestant leader who dissolved the abbey, Diederik Sonoy, before the buildings were destroyed. In recent decades the current monastery has been able to recover many lost relics, or at least information about them. The old abbey had been of great importance to artists, and much of that art has survived, against all odds. 

Moreover, in the intervening period from 1568 until the remaining ruins were finally demolished in about 1800, the abbey and the associated castle ruins served as an inspiration in its damaged state to many artists who visited Bergen, Schoorl or Egmond to paint the ruins, among them Jacob van Ruisdael in 1655-60.

References

External links
 
  

Christian monasteries established in the 7th century
Benedictine monasteries in the Netherlands
Buildings and structures in North Holland
Bergen, North Holland
Monasteries dissolved under the Dutch Reformation
7th-century churches
Burial sites of the House of Holland (nobility)